The Rock n Roll Rats are a Canadian punk rock group formed in 2009 in Calgary, Alberta.  The Rock n Roll Rats are influenced by punk rock bands including The Ramones, The Forgotten Rebels, Teenage Head and The Misfits. This pop-punk quad plays three and four chord songs in a medium tempo and often puts the "hook" to their songs out front and centre.  The Rock n Roll Rats do not align themselves with any specific ideologies or political views, instead writing songs about their love for Punk rock.

History

The Rock n Roll Rats formed in late 2009 with members Johnny Forgotten (Guitar, Vocals), Jesse Death (Bass, backup vocals), and Conor Smith (drums). The band's first live performance was for Phil Bunton's wedding, held at The Old Motorcycle Shop (Calgary, AB). As a three piece, they independently recorded and released their first full-length LP at The Beach studios in Calgary.  To promote the new LP, they played numerous gigs in and out of their hometown before achieving any notoriety.  Their debut LP was officially released on iTunes and other mainstream retailers in 2010. The band has recorded a second release that includes 10 new original songs written and composed by Johnny Forgotten and Jesse Death as well as a cover of "Rock n' Roll's a Hard Life" by The Forgotten Rebels, which also appears on The Forgotten Rebels tribute CD. Their 2013 release comprises five original songs written by Johnny Forgotten and features Richie Ramone, who played drums for The Ramones from 1983 - 1987.

Since their inception, The Rock n Roll Rats have played shows with a number of notable bands including: C.J. Ramone, The Creepshow, The Raygun Cowboys, The Nailheads, and The Intensives.

Members
Johnny Forgotten: Guitar and Singing 
Jesse Death: Bass and Backup Vocals
Conor Smith: Drums

Johnny Forgotten has been playing in punk rock bands since 1993. In 1996, he fronted "Smash The State" which gained some attention locally, releasing one cassette titled "Your Logo Here", and appeared on "The Mobile Music Machine" (cable TV showcase). Smash The State also appeared on a compilation CD put out by OMAC (Original Music Association of Calgary). Jesse Death is well known for driving a 1993 Buick Hearse as his sole transportation.  He wrote the single Coffin Love and continues to be a key original member of the band. Conor Smith (drums) was nicknamed "John Connor" by his bandmates in homage to the protagonist character in The Terminator movies. Conor Smith and Jesse Death are long time friends, who went to school together in Fort McMurray Alberta and played in several punk bands important to the local music scene. For a brief period The Rock n' Roll Rats had a second guitar player, Jay "Ramone" Parrott (from Thomaston Georgia USA) who left the band due to family obligations.  The band has not undergone any other lineup changes and all current members are original.

Discography
 Snot Rocket - Single (2010)
 The Rock n Roll Rats L.P. (2010)
 Coffin Love - Single (2011)
 Canadian Punk Rock Born in 1977 (2012)
 The Rock n Roll Rats With Richie Ramone EP Featuring Richie Ramone on drums (2013)
 "Rock & Roll's a Hard Life" and "Underwear" contributed to the first and only official Forgotten Rebels Tribute CD (2012)
 "Sick of The City" LP (2013)

References
Note: All of these web pages are no longer available
 Calgary Herald: "Calgary punk band The Rock n Roll Rats reconciles punk rock and patriotism"
 Alberta Music Industry Association: "Rock n Roll Rats Profile"
 Beatroute Magazine: 
 Rebirth Events Concert Reviews: Rock n Roll Rats, Caught off Guard, Genetic Decay at Lord Nelsons Review
 Calgary Cassette Preservation Society CCPS: "Smash The State" 
 Richie Ramone announces he will be guest drummer on Rock n Roll Rats new EP http://www.richieramone.com/

Musical groups established in 2009
Musical groups from Calgary
Canadian punk rock groups
2009 establishments in Alberta